The Navy Midshipmen college football team competes in the National Collegiate Athletic Association (NCAA) Division I Football Bowl Subdivision, representing the United States Naval Academy in the western division of the American Athletic Conference. The Midshipmen have played their home games at Navy–Marine Corps Memorial Stadium in Annapolis, Maryland since 1959.

Seasons

References
Footnotes

Bibliography 

Navy Midshipmen

Navy Midshipmen football seasons